Aviaport is a rural locality (a selo), one of five settlements, in addition to Olyokminsk, the administrative centre of the settlement, Zaton LORPa, Neftebaza and Selivanovo in the Town of Olyokminsk of Olyokminsky District in the Sakha Republic, Russia. Its population as of the 2002 Census was 480.

References

Notes

Sources
Official website of the Sakha Republic. Registry of the Administrative-Territorial Divisions of the Sakha Republic. Olyokminsky District. 

Rural localities in Olyokminsky District